Mohamed Salahdine Boubacar Saleck (born 31 December 1997) is a Mauritanian footballer who plays as a goalkeeper for Tevragh-Zeina and the Mauritania national team.

International career
Salahdine made his debut for Mauritania on 5 September 2015 against South Africa. He was included in Mauritania's squad for the 2018 African Nations Championship in Morocco.

Career statistics

International
Statistics accurate as of match played 6 October 2016

Honours 
Ligue 1 Mauritania: winner (2015–16)
Coupe du Président de la République: winner (2016)

References

External links
 
 

1997 births
Living people
Mauritanian footballers
Mauritania international footballers
Association football goalkeepers
FC Tevragh-Zeina players
2018 African Nations Championship players
Mauritania A' international footballers